I Am a Killer is a series on Netflix and Crime+Investigation UK featuring interviews with death row inmates. Season 2 aired in the United Kingdom in 2019 and aired internationally on Netflix from January 31, 2020. On August 30, 2022, Season 3 aired on Netflix in the United States. A fourth season was released on December 21, 2022, on Netflix.

Episodes

Series overview

Season 1 (2018)

Season 2 (2020)

Season 3 (2022)

Season 4 (2022)

References

External links
Crime+Investigation show page
The official podcast
 

True crime television series
2010s British documentary television series
2020s British documentary television series
English-language Netflix original programming
Documentary television series about crime
Netflix original documentary television series
2018 British television series debuts